Adam Lavorgna (born March 1, 1981) is an American actor, known for his role on the television series Brooklyn Bridge, and in the films Milk Money, The Beautician and the Beast, and I'll Be Home for Christmas, and as  Robbie Palmer on 7th Heaven.

Early life
Lavorgna was born near New Haven, in North Branford, Connecticut, the son of Sandra (née Schnepf), a college professor, and Joseph LaVorgna, a high school assistant principal. 

Lavorgna attended high school at Avon Old Farms in Avon, Connecticut. He also enrolled at Boston College, prior to leaving the school after his freshman year to pursue acting, specifically, 7th Heaven.

Career
Lavorgna starred as Nicholas Scamperelli in the series Brooklyn Bridge, for which he received the 1993 Youth in Film Award for Best Actor. He then joined 7th Heaven as a series regular portraying Robbie Palmer, Mary's (Jessica Biel) troubled ex-boyfriend who has moved into the family home. He left the show in 2002. LaVorgna recalled his choice to leave was due to having a hard time managing his way around Hollywood, California, in addition to missing his family, mutually agreeing with the staff of 7th Heaven for a dismissal. He returned to the East Coast of the US subsequently.

Personal life
Lavorgna said he was raised in Catholicism by his grandmother but became distant from the faith with age: "I got away from church at 15–16, and by my mid-20s, I was lost."

Filmography

Film

Television

References

External links
 

1981 births
20th-century American male actors
21st-century American male actors
American male child actors
American male film actors
American male television actors
Boston College alumni
Fairfield University alumni
Living people
Male actors from New Haven, Connecticut
Avon Old Farms alumni